Ernő Hetényi (aka Ernest Hetényi 1912–1999) was a Hungarian tibetologist and the leader of the Arya Maitreya Mandala for Eastern Europe.

Life 
Heténys father was the operetta composer Albert Hetényi Heidelberg (1875–1951).

Ernő Hetényi was the founder of the Buddhist society of Hungary in 1951. As a disciple of Lama Anagarika Govinda he became leader of the order of the Arya Maitreya Mandala. During Communist government Buddhism as practising religion was not encouraged, but the activity of the Buddhist community was tolerated by the authorities. "In 1956 Dr. Hetényi founded the Alexander Csoma des Körös Institute for Buddhology, the order’s first academic institution in Europe. He has been very successful in strengthening the order’s ties with Buddhist communities and institutions in Mongolia and countries of the former Soviet Union."

Hetényi published numerous books and articles on Buddhism and Tibet. He was also a researcher of the History of Buddhism in Hungary.

Works 
 Kőrösi Csoma Sándor dokumentáció. Budapest 1982, 
 Alexander Csoma de Körös. The Hungarian Bodhisattva. Budapest 1984
 A Változás Könyve. Háttér 1989, 
 Tibeti Halottaskönyv. Hatter Kiado 1991, 
 Tibeti tanítók titkos tanításai. Trivium Kiadó 1996,

References

External links 
 Ernest Hetényi in The Tibetan & Himalyan Library
 History of The Buddhist Order Arya Maitreya Mandala

1912 births
1999 deaths
Converts to Buddhism
Tibetan Buddhism writers
Tibetologists
20th-century Hungarian historians
Hungarian Buddhists